Calabouço is a location in Cabo Delgado Province, Mozambique.

External links 
 http://www.geonames.org/1085175/calabouco.html

Populated places in Cabo Delgado Province